Edmunds is a surname derived from the given name Edmund.  There are varied spellings.  People with the name Edmunds include:

 Christiana Edmunds (1828–1907), British poisoner
 Dave Edmunds (born 1944), British rock guitarist
 David Edmunds (born c. 1935), British mathematician
 Don Edmunds (1930–2020), American racing car driver
 George F. Edmunds (1828–1919), Senator from Vermont
 James M. Edmunds (1810–1879), Michigan politician
 Margo Edmunds, American health policy researcher
 Newton Edmunds (1819–1908), American politician
 Polina Edmunds (born 1998), American figure skater
 Raymond Edmunds "Mr Stinky" (born 1944) Australian murderer rapist
 Richard Edmunds (athlete) (born 1937), American sprinter
 Richard Edmunds (cricketer) (1970–1989), English cricketer
 Robert H. Edmunds Jr. (born 1949), American lawyer
 R. H. Edmunds (1834–1917), Australian explorer
 Terrell Edmunds (born 1998), American football player
 Tremaine Edmunds (born 1998), American football player

Fictional character
 Chase Edmunds, on the television series 24

See also
 Edmonds (surname)
 Edmund (given name)

redundant

English-language surnames
Patronymic surnames
Surnames from given names